Nova Gradiška is a town located in the Brod-Posavina County of Croatia, population 14,229 (2011). It is located in the historic region of Slavonia, near the border to Bosnia and Herzegovina.

The first word in the name means New, and there's also an Old Gradiška nearby, the village of Stara Gradiška and the Bosnian town of Gradiška.

History

Nova Gradiška is often referred to as The Youngest Town.

The town of Nova Gradiška was founded in 1748 as an outpost in the Military Frontier and was first named Friedrichsdorf in German. Already in 1750 it was renamed Neu-Gradischka which later became Nova Gradiška in Croatian. The Hungarian name is Újgradiska.

Before 1881, Nova Gradiška (named NEU-GRADISKA before 1850) was part of the Austrian monarchy (Kingdom of Croatia-Slavonia after the compromise of 1867), in the Slavonian Military Frontier, Gradiskaner Regiment N°VIII.

The first building constructed was the church of Saint Tereza, which is an important monument of baroque architecture in Slavonia. The old core of the town comprises the church of Saint Terezija and the old court house and prison from the 18th century.

Between 1881 and 1918, Nova Gradiška was a district capital in the Požega County of the Kingdom.

Communications
The town is located on the M104 railway line, frequently served by passenger trains at the local Nova Gradiška railway station. The A3 motorway also passes nearby. The highway and railway are part of the Pan European corridor X. Bus traffic within the town as well as suburban traffic is very well developed. There is also a connection to Požega via the D51 road and the nearby border crossing to Bosnia and Herzegovina, located in Stara Gradiška.

Settlements
The administrative area of Nova Gradiška includes the following settlements:
 Kovačevac, population 669
 Ljupina, population 987
 Nova Gradiška, population 11,821
 Prvča, population 752

Tourism
Here are several hotels and other tourist resorts present. The Tourist board is also present and well developed in Nova Gradiška. There are a number of townfaires. Some of the most important ones are:

 Carnival festivities "Pokladne svečanosti"
 Flower show "Izložba cvijeća"
 The Folklore Show ("međužupanijska smotra folklora")
 The display of traditional wind instruments ("smotra tradicijskih puhačkih instrumenata")
 Nova Gradiška Music Summer ("Novogradiško glazbeno Ljeto")
 Oldtimer car meeting ("susreti oldtimera")
 Fishfaire ("fišijada")
 Mushroom festival ("izložba gljiva")
 Motorcycle riders meeting "Strmac" ("Motoristički susreti Strmac")

Religion
Maria Theresa granted the rights for construction of the Roman Catholic Chapel of Teresa of Ávila in Nova Gradiška in 1756. The church was damaged by the forces of the Republic of Serbian Krajina during the Croatian War of Independence. In the 19th century the new Church of Virgin Mary on the town square was initiated. Aulic Council prevented the authorities of the Slavonian Military Frontier from destroying the church with intention to build a school at its place.

Historically, there were also two Serbian Orthodox Churches in Nova Gradiška, one of them destroyed during the World War II and one during the Croatian War of Independence. Those were the Church of Saint Nicholas and the Church of the Holy Trinity. The Church of the Holy Trinity was the central orthodox church located at the town square. It was erected in 1824 at the spot of an earlier wooden church from 1755. The church was destructed by the Ustasha regime in 1941. The new neo-Byzantine Church of the Holy Trinity was complete in 1982 but it was detonated 9 times and destroyed during the Croatian War of Independence. The second church of Saint Nicholas was constructed in 1818 on the local cemetery, it was reconstructed in 1866 but it was also destroyed during the Croatian War of Independence.

Local electronic media
Croatian Radio Nova Gradiška is the local radio station.

Commerce
Today some furniture industry and beer industry exists in small parts. There is an initiative to extend the industry park.

Before the Croatian War of Independence, there was metallurgy industry in the town, which went bankrupt.

People
 Đura Horvatović – Serbian Officer
 Slavko Brill – sculptor and ceramics artist
 Goran Vlaović – footballer
 Milan Rapaić – footballer
 Marko Malenica – footballer
 Kim Verson – singer
 Mia Pojatina – model and Miss Universe Croatia 2018
 Imakulata Malinka – organist, nun, music pedagogue
 Svyetlana Canak – Scientist
 Adolf Dado Topic - singer

References

External links

 Official site 
 Town map 

Cities and towns in Croatia
Slavonia
Populated places in Brod-Posavina County
Požega County
18th-century establishments in Croatia
1748 establishments in the Habsburg monarchy